Trinity Music City, now called Huckabee Theater and formerly Twitty City,
is an entertainment complex in Hendersonville, Tennessee. It was famous for its lavish Christmas decorations, and includes the Conway Twitty Mansion and Memorial Gardens.
Since Twitty's death, it has been converted into a Christian music venue owned by the Trinity Broadcasting Network, along with the studios of their Nashville area station WPGD-TV. It is also the home to Mike Huckabee's television show, Huckabee, which is also broadcast live from the venue's studios.

History
It was first the home of singer Conway Twitty from its opening in 1982 until his death in 1993 as he lived there for many years. He built the house, which also was a country music entertainment complex, and was known as Twitty City at a cost of over $3.5 million. Twitty and Twitty City were once featured on the TV series Lifestyles of the Rich and Famous with Robin Leach, and was also seen in the Nashville episode of the BBC series Entertainment USA, presented by Jonathan King. There were also homes for Twitty's mother as well as his children. Opened in 1982, it was a popular tourist stop throughout the 1980s and into the early 1990s; it was shut down in 1994 following a year-long tribute show called Final Touches, when fans and peers in the music business dropped by. The complex was auctioned off and bought by the Trinity Broadcasting Network that same year. The venue was renamed to Trinity Music City immediately after.

On July 3, 2016, Trinity Music City stopped holding tours to the public. Station Manager of WPGD-TV and Trinity Music City, Becky Bustin confirmed that, “We do not give tours any longer”, and also saying that, “The tours were suspended indefinitely as of July 3rd and it was a corporate decision.”

As of October 7, 2017, the revived television program, Huckabee, hosted by former Republican Arkansas Governor Mike Huckabee, now broadcasts its pre-recorded shows in front of a live audience at Trinity Music City. Also the venue took on a second name, "Huckabee Theater".

References

Music venues in Tennessee
Buildings and structures in Sumner County, Tennessee